Cheryl Kreviazuk (born September 25, 1992) is a Canadian curler from Ottawa, Ontario. She currently plays second on Team Danielle Inglis.

She is better known as the alternate for the Rachel Homan rink in 2015, when the team won bronze at the 2015 Scotties Tournament of Hearts, and in 2017, when they won gold at the 2017 Scotties Tournament of Hearts and the 2017 World Women's Curling Championship.

Personal life
Her sisters are well known curlers: Alison Kreviazuk, who played second for the Homan rink, and Lynn Kreviazuk, current second for Team Harrison. Kreviazuk attended Wilfrid Laurier University and Sir Robert Borden High School. Kreviazuk currently works as a clinical research coordinator at the Children's Hospital of Eastern Ontario Research Institute.

Her (and Alison and Lynn's) father is Doug Kreviazuk. He is a former board member with the Ontario Curling Association and a curling coach (he also coached Team Canada at the 2015 Winter Universiade, in which Lynn played).

Her second cousin is the singer Chantal Kreviazuk.

Teams

References

External links

1992 births
Canadian people of Ukrainian descent
Curlers from Ottawa
Living people
Canadian women curlers